The Church of St. Mary Magdalene is a Grade-I listed church located in Keyworth, Nottinghamshire, England.

Description

The church dates from the fourteenth century. Nikolaus Pevsner noted that the tower of the church is unique in the county. It was restored by George Frederick Bodley between 1871 and 1872.

The church is in a joint parish with 
Bradmore Mission Room
St Mary's Church, Bunny
All Saints' Church, Stanton on the Wolds

Stained glass

Early work by Burlison and Grylls.

List of incumbents

1270 Ralph Barre
1270 Nicholas de Leyton
1272 Hugh de Stapilford
1288 Hugh de Barri
1303 Henry de Byngham
1312 Ralp Rosell
1362 Richard de Barewe
1379 Micholas Lawe
Nicholas Goodyer
1407 Robert Chubbe
John Leake
1420 William Worsley
1421 William Averham
1423 William FitzHenry de Whatton
1434 William Isabell
John Brounfled
1471 Nicholas Spede
1502 Henry Ridyng
1515 Robert Freman
1531 John Cokys
1543 Laurence Lee
1548 John Browne
1585 William Barker
1619 William Smyth
1656 Philip Ormeston
1660 William Goodall
1708 Charles Drury
1715 Thomas Wood
1728 Edward Moises
1751 Richard Barnard
1783 Thomas Beaumont
1794 Sampson Parkyns
1801 William Beetham
1833 John Champion
1834 Edward Thompson
1842 John Hancock
1859 Alfred Potter
1878 Henry Pratt Ling
1928 P W Rushmer
1930 A D Brooker
1949 George Fry
1960 Jack Gibson
1970 John Ottey
1985 John Hardy
1994 Trevor Sisson
2007 James Frederick Wellington

References

14th-century church buildings in England
Church of England church buildings in Nottinghamshire
Grade I listed churches in Nottinghamshire
Mary